Damage Incorporated is a 2.5D first-person shooter for Mac OS using the Marathon 2 engine and published by MacSoft in 1997. It was ported to Microsoft Windows.

Gameplay
The player commands a squad of four marines in counter-terrorism operations. Visuals are displayed using the Marathon engine's multi-floor 2.5D system. It includes a networked deathmatch mode.

Reception

Next Generation reviewed the Macintosh version of the game, rating it four stars out of five, and stated that "If you enjoy first-person shooters, you're going to find a lot to like about this."

MacHome Journal chose Damage Incorporated for the "Best Action Game" category in their "Home Choice Awards." They wrote, "With the incorporation of the teamwork concept into a 3-D shooter, Damage Incorporated provides additional strategy and immersiveness in an exhilarating marine strike force game for a mere $30."

MacWorld wrote, "Damage Incorporated's creator admits he has no real military knowledge, and it shows." The reviewer concluded, "It's a valiant attempt to advance the first-person shooter genre by incorporating a strategic element, but poor design and uneven implementation sabotage it."

References

External links
 Damage Incorporated

1997 video games
First-person shooters
Classic Mac OS games
Tactical shooter video games
Video games developed in the United States
Windows games
Marathon engine games
Video games about the United States Marine Corps
Video games set in Arkansas
Video games set in Nebraska
Video games set in North Carolina
Video games set in Sicily
Video games set in St. Louis
Video games set in Utah
Video games with 2.5D graphics
Sprite-based first-person shooters
WizardWorks games
Multiplayer and single-player video games
MacSoft games